The 1926 European Wrestling Championships were held in Riga (Latvia) in 1926 under the organization of the International Federation of Associated Wrestling (FILA) and the Latvian Wrestling Federation. It only competed in the Greco-Roman style categories.

Medal table

Medal summary

Men's Greco-Roman

References

External links
FILA Database

1926 in European sport
International sports competitions hosted by Latvia
Wrestling in Latvia
European Wrestling Championships